Großer Winterberg is a mountain of Saxony, southeastern Germany. It is the second highest mountain of the Saxon Switzerland and is located on the border between Germany and the Czech Republic. 

Mountains of Saxon Switzerland
Elbe Sandstone Mountains